Calvin Duane Murray (born July 30, 1971) is a former baseball player who played outfield in the major leagues from 1999 to 2004 for the San Francisco Giants, Texas Rangers, and Chicago Cubs. He is a 1989 graduate of Dallas' W. T. White High School. He was drafted by the Cleveland Indians in the first round of the 1989 Major League Baseball Draft, but did not sign, and instead attended the University of Texas. He was the batter facing Randy Johnson when Johnson hit a dove with a fastball in a spring training game in 2001.

He is the younger brother of Kevin Murray, who was a quarterback at Texas A&M University from 1983 to 1986.  He is the uncle of 2018 Heisman Trophy winner Kyler Murray.

Notes

External links

1971 births
Living people
San Francisco Giants players
Texas Rangers players
Chicago Cubs players
Major League Baseball outfielders
Baseball players from Dallas
Texas Longhorns baseball players
San Jose Giants players
Shreveport Captains players
Phoenix Firebirds players
Fresno Grizzlies players
Oklahoma RedHawks players
Las Vegas 51s players
Iowa Cubs players
Pacific Coast League MVP award winners
All-American college baseball players
W. T. White High School alumni
Anchorage Bucs players